Çiləgir may refer to:
Çılğır, Azerbaijan
Çiləgir, Khachmaz, Azerbaijan
Çiləgir, Qusar, Azerbaijan